Teleidosaurus is an extinct genus of carnivorous metriorhynchoid crocodyliform from Middle Jurassic (late Bajocian to early Bathonian stage) deposits of Normandy, France. The name Teleidosaurus means "Complete lizard", and is derived from the Greek - ("complete") and  -sauros ("lizard").

Discovery 
 
The type species was named Teleosaurus Calvadosii [Sic] by Jacques Amand Eudes-Deslongchamps in 1866; however, it was his son, Eugène Eudes-Deslongchamps who erected the generic name Teleidosaurus later in 1869  for Teleosaurus calvadosii. Teleidosaurus joberti from the Great Oolite Formation is a junior synonym of T. calvadosii. T. calvadosii is known from the plastotype NHM R.2681, a complete skull and mandible and from NHM 32612, the plastotype of T. joberti, fragmentary right mandible. The holotype lost during the Second World War.

Classification
The only species within Teleidosaurus is the type species T. calvadosii. Both T. bathonicus and T. gaudryi where referred to Eoneustes. All species are from Calvados, Normandy of France. Recent phylogenetic analyses do not support the monophyly of Teleidosaurus.

References

Fossil taxa described in 1869
Middle Jurassic crocodylomorphs
Prehistoric pseudosuchian genera
Prehistoric marine crocodylomorphs
Fossils of France
Thalattosuchians